This list is of former Cultural Properties of Japan that  have been struck from the register as a result of heavy damage or total destruction during the twentieth and early twenty-first centuries, as identified and catalogued by the Agency for Cultural Affairs.

Structures
101 properties

Castles
17 properties

Mausolea
15 properties

Miscellaneous structures
1 property

Shrines
19 properties

Temples
40 properties

Residences
9 properties

Works of Fine Art
74 properties

Paintings
12 properties

Sculptures
34 properties

Crafts
16 properties

Calligraphic works
10 properties

Stone monuments
2 properties

See also

 Cultural Properties of Japan
 Lists of National Treasures of Japan
 Conservation Techniques for Cultural Properties
 Hague Convention for the Protection of Cultural Property in the Event of Armed Conflict

References

Former